Vacheron Constantin SA is a Swiss luxury watch and clock manufacturer founded in 1755. Since 1996, it has been a subsidiary of the Swiss Richemont Group. Vacheron Constantin is the second oldest Swiss manufacturer and one of the oldest watch manufacturers in the world with an uninterrupted watchmaking history since its foundation in 1755. It employs around 1,200 people worldwide as of 2018, most of whom are based in the company's manufacturing plants in the Canton of Geneva and Vallée de Joux in Switzerland.

Vacheron Constantin is a highly regarded watch manufacturer. The Vacheron Constantin pocket watch No. 402833 (1929), which was owned by King Fuad I of Egypt, ranks as one of the most expensive watches ever sold at auction, fetching US$2.77 million (3,306,250 CHF) in Geneva on April 3, 2005. In 2015, Vacheron Constantin introduced the pocket watch Reference 57260, which currently holds the title of the most complicated mechanical watch ever made, with 57 horological complications.

History

Early history 

The business was founded in 1755 by Jean-Marc Vacheron, an independent watchmaker in Geneva, Switzerland. He was a close friend of leading Enlightenment philosophers Jean-Jacques Rousseau and Voltaire due to their common interests in philosophy, science and watchmaking. In 1770, Vacheron's company created the world's first horological complication, and nine years later he designed the first engine-turned dials. The son of Jean-Marc Vacheron, Abraham Vacheron took over the family business in 1785. In 1810, Jacques-Barthélemy Vacheron, the grandson of the founder, became the head of the company. He was the first to initiate the company's exports to France and Italy. 
Later, Jacques-Barthélemy realized that he was not able to handle the business alone. In order to travel overseas and sell the company's products, he needed a partner. Consequently, in 1819, François Constantin became an associate of Vacheron. The company continued its activities under the new name Vacheron & Constantin.  The company's motto (which remains today), "Faire mieux si possible, ce qui est toujours possible (Do better if possible and that is always possible)", first appeared in Constantin's letter to Jacques-Barthélémy. The letter was dated July 5, 1819.

François Constantin traveled around the world and marketed watches. The main market at the time was North America. In 1833, Vacheron and Constantin hired Georges-Auguste Leschot, whose job was to supervise the manufacturing operations. In particular, Leschot was an inventor and his creations turned out to be a success for the company. His inventions had significant impact on the watchmaking industry in general, and he was the first person to standardize watch movements into Calibers. In 1844, Georges-Auguste Leschot was awarded with a gold medal from the Arts Society of Geneva, which highly appreciated Leschot's pantographic device - a device that was able to mechanically engrave small watch parts and dials.

Re-organization 
After François Constantin's death in 1854 and Jacques-Barthélemy Vacheron's death in 1863, the company was taken over by a series of heirs. At one point, the company was headed by two women. In 1862, Vacheron Constantin became a member of the Association for Research into non-magnetic materials.

In 1877, Vacheron & Constantin, Fabricants, Geneve became the official name of the company. In 1880, the company started using the Maltese cross as its symbol until today. This was inspired by a component of the barrel, which had a cross-shape and was used for limiting the tension within the mainspring.

In 1887, Vacheron & Constantin was reorganized into a joint-stock company. Notably, in the same year, Fabergé's 1887 Third Imperial Egg contained a Vacheron Constantin Lady's watch as the surprise. For the remarkable achievements of the company, Vacheron & Constantin was awarded a gold medal at the Swiss National Exhibition in Geneva in 1887. The first Vacheron & Constantin boutique in Geneva was opened in 1906.

During the Great Depression, Vacheron & Constantin found itself in a difficult situation. In 1936, Charles Constantin became the head of the company, the first time since 1850s that a representative from the Constantin family became the president of Vacheron & Constantin. However, in 1940, Georges Ketterer acquired the majority portion of the stock of Vacheron & Constantin from Charles Constantin.

Recent development

George Ketterer died in 1969, and his son, Jacques Ketterer, succeeded as the head of Vacheron & Constantin. In 1970, the company officially changed its name to Vacheron Constantin.

Vacheron Constantin was affected by the quartz crisis during 1970s and 1980s. When Jacques Ketterer died in 1987, Vacheron Constantin changed hands. Sheik Ahmed Zaki Yamani, the former Oil Minister of Saudi Arabia and avid watch collector, became the company's majority shareholder, who then folded Vacheron Constantin into his personal portfolio of holdings. In 1996, the entire share capital of Vacheron Constantin was bought by the Swiss Richemont Group.

In 2004, Vacheron Constantin opened its new headquarters and manufacture in Plan-les-Ouates, Geneva. The Vacheron Constantin headquarters building in Geneva was designed by Bernard Tschumi, and has been noted for its architectural significance. In October 2005, the Richemont Group named Juan Carlos Torres as the chief executive officer of the company. Currently, the company is an active member of the Federation of the Swiss Watch Industry FH, and produces about 20,000 timepieces per year.

Motto and slogan 
The company motto of Vacheron Constantin is "Faire mieux si possible, ce qui est toujours possible (Do better if possible, and that is always possible)". The motto first appeared in a François Constantin's letter to Jacques-Barthélémy, and the letter was dated July 5, 1819.

Watch manufacturing

Notable inventions and patents 
The following are some of the notable achievements of Vacheron Constantin in watch manufacturing.

In 1790, created the world's first watch complication.
 In 1824, created a jumping-hour watch.
 In 1885, created the first nonmagnetic timepiece which included a complete lever assortment made of materials able to withstand magnetic fields. Its construction included a balance wheel, balance spring and lever shaft that were made of palladium, the lever arms—in bronze and the escape wheel was in gold.
In 1901, received the first Geneva Seal (Hallmark of Geneva) for its timepieces.
In 1929, created a "Grande Complication" pocket watch, No. 402833, for King Fuad I of Egypt.
In 1955, produced the world's thinnest manual-winding movement, the Calibre 1003.
In 1992, created the world's thinnest minute repeater, the Calibre 1755.
In 2015, created Reference 57260, the most complicated mechanical watch/pocket watch ever made, with 57 complications.

Environmental rating 
In December 2018, World Wide Fund for Nature (WWF) released a report assigning environmental ratings to 15 major watch manufacturers and jewelers in Switzerland. Vacheron Constantin was given an average environmental rating as "Upper Midfield", suggesting that the manufacturer has taken first actions addressing the impact of its manufacturing activities on the environment and climate change.

Notable models

Most expensive pieces 

 In 1979, Vacheron Constantin made Kallista, one of the most expensive wristwatches in the world. Its initial price was $5 million, but in 2016 the watch was valued at about $11 million. Kallista had 118 emerald-cut diamonds. It took about 6,000 hours for the watch masters to make this watch and about 20 months for jewelers to enrich the watch.
 On April 3, 2005, the Vacheron Constantin pocket watch Ref. 402833 (1929), which was owned by King Fuad I of Egypt, fetched a final price of 2.77 million US dollars (3,306,250 CHF) in Antiquorum's Geneva auction.
On April 3, 2005, a Vacheron Constantin mysterious clock was auctioned by Antiquorum for 1.83 million US dollars (2,206,250 CHF) in Geneva.
 On April 3, 2005, a Vacheron Constantin wristwatch Tour de I'lle fetched 1.56 million US dollars (1,876,250 CHF) in Antiquorum's Geneva auction.
 On June 15, 2011, a Vacheron Constantin minute repeater pocket watch (1918), which was owned by James Ward Packard, was auctioned for 1.76 million US dollars in Christie's New York auction.

Overseas wristwatch 
In 1996, Vacheron Constantin formally introduced a new high-end sports line called Overseas. The precursor of Overseas collection, however, was originally introduced in 1977 during the quartz crisis. The precursor was the wristwatch Ref. 222, which was designed by a 23-year-old designer named Jorg Hysek.

The original version of Overseas was revamped in 2004, and was re-invented again in 2016. Some of the Overseas wristwatches also come with complications such as chronograph, World Time, tourbillon, moon phase, and so on.

Patrimony wristwatch 
The Patrimony wristwatch is a model of Vacheron Constantin. The collection was introduced in 2004, and is known for its simple and elegant design as well as its ultra-thin case. The designer was inspired by some of the company's watch models back in 1950s.

In 2009, Vacheron Constantin decided to integrate the minute repeating complication into some of the Patrimony wristwatches, and the end product was the Patrimony Calibre 1731, the world's thinnest minute repeater. The current Patrimony collection also includes some other complications such as perpetual calendars, moon phase indicators, and so on.

Métiers d'Art wristwatch 
In 2007, Vacheron Constantin introduced the Métiers d'Art 'Les Masques' collection of timepieces featuring miniature reproductions of primitive art masks. The company selected 12 masks from a private museum collection and reproduced them on a small scale. The miniaturized masks are featured in the dial centre of every watch from the 'Les Masques' collection.

In 2012, Vacheron Constantin introduced the Métiers d'Art 'Les Univers Infinis' collection of timepieces featuring tessellation, a design of interlocking shapes inspired by the work of the Dutch artist M. C. Escher.

250th anniversary edition 

In 2005, Vacheron Constantin created the wristwatch "Tour de I'lle" to mark the anniversary of 250 years of Vacheron Constantin. The watch includes 834 parts and 16 horological complications, including tourbillon, minute repeater, moon phase as well as moon age, and took over 10,000 hours of research and development.

The Tour de l'lle wristwatch is one of the most complicated wristwatches in the world. In total, only seven pieces were manufactured, each of which had a sale price over US$1 million. On April 3, 2005, a Tour de I'lle wristwatch fetched a final price of 1.56 million US dollars (1,876,250 CHF) in Antiquorum's Geneva auction. The auctioned piece has a unique black dial.

260th anniversary edition 

In 2015, during the manufacturer's 260th anniversary, Vacheron Constantin revealed the world's most complicated mechanical watch, named Reference 57260. The pocket watch took three watchmakers eight years to build the 57-complication pocket watch at the request of a client. Vacheron Constantin would not disclose the exact price of this watch but did confirm that it was between 8 million and 20 million US dollars.

The Reference 57260 is part of Vacheron Constantin's lineage of tailor-made grand complicated pocket watches since James W. Packard's pocket watch (1918), which was auctioned for US$1.763 million by Christie's in New York on June 15, 2011. In addition, the Vacheron Constantin pocket watch Ref. 402833 (1929), which was tailored for King Fuad I of Egypt, ranks as one of the most expensive watches ever sold at auction, fetching US$2.77 million (3,306,250 CHF) in Geneva on April 3, 2005. In 1946, Vacheron Constantin tailored a complicated pocket watch for King Farouk of Egypt, the successor of King Fuad I, and in 1948 the company tailored another one for Count Guy de Boisrouvray of France.

See also

List of watch manufacturers
Manufacture d'horlogerie
The Vacheron Constantin Reference 57260
Tour de I'lle

References

External links

 
 Official Vacheron Constantin discussion forum
 Vacheron Constantin—The Oldest Watchmaking Company?—Disputing the fact that Vacheron Constantin is the oldest watchmaker
 Vacheron Constantin's Infinite Illusion Of Time: Les Univers Infinis
 Vacheron Constantin and the Art of Openworking

1755 establishments in Europe
Swiss watch brands
Watch manufacturing companies of Switzerland
Luxury brands
Richemont brands
18th-century establishments in Switzerland
Companies established in 1755